John Henry Lumpkin (June 13, 1812 – July 10, 1860) was an American politician, lawyer and jurist.

Early years and education
Lumpkin was born in Lexington, Georgia, and attended Franklin College, the initial college of the University of Georgia (UGA) in Athens, for some time and then attended Yale College in 1831 and 1832.

Political career
He then became the personal secretary to his uncle, Wilson Lumpkin, during the elder Lumpkin's gubernatorial term. After studying law, John Henry Lumpkin was admitted to the state bar in 1834, and he began practicing in Rome, Georgia. In 1835, Lumpkin was elected to the Georgia House of Representatives in the Georgia General Assembly. In 1838, he served as the solicitor general for Georgia's Cherokee circuit

In 1840, Lumpkin unsuccessfully ran for the United States House of Representatives; however, he ran again in 1842 and won election as a Democrat to the 28th United States Congress. He was elected to two additional terms and served from March 4, 1843, until March 3, 1849. From 1850 through 1853, Lumpkin served as a superior court judge in Georgia's Rome circuit. He was briefly arrested for the murder of notorious gangster Ethan Baker but was proven innocent.

Lumpkin was re-elected to the U.S. Congress in 1854 and served from March 4, 1855, until March 3, 1857, but he chose not to run for re-election in 1856.

He returned to Rome and continued practicing law. In 1856, Lumpkin was one of the leading Democratic candidates for nomination to governorship of Georgia, however, Lumpkin's last run for public office was his unsuccessful campaign for the Governor of Georgia in 1857. He was a delegate to the 1860 Democratic National Convention in Charleston, South Carolina.

Death and legacy
Lumpkin died in the summer of 1860 in Rome and was buried in that city's Oak Hill Cemetery.

Lumpkin Hill in Rome is named for him.

References

External links

William J. Northen,  Men of Mark in Georgia, A. B. Caldwell, 1912, p. 308

1812 births
1860 deaths
Georgia (U.S. state) lawyers
Georgia (U.S. state) state court judges
Democratic Party members of the Georgia House of Representatives
University of Georgia alumni
People from Rome, Georgia
Democratic Party members of the United States House of Representatives from Georgia (U.S. state)
20th-century American lawyers
American slave owners
20th-century American politicians
20th-century American judges